Socialist Workers' Party was a political party in Finland. The STP was founded in 1973 as split from Social Democratic Union of Workers and Smallholders (TPSL). STP emerged from a group that did not approve of the return of TPSL to the Social Democratic Party.

STP had electoral alliances with Finnish People's Democratic League (SKDL), the mass front dominated by the Communist Party of Finland (SKP) but with little success. When SKP (and SKDL) split in 1985-1986 STP cooperated with Democratic Alternative which was founded by Communist Party of Finland (Unity) (SKPy).

In February 1990, STP chairman Pentti Waltzer said the party would join the new Left Alliance if Democratic Alternative decided to merge with it, which later happened.

Elections

See also 
 List of Social Democratic Party (Finland) breakaway parties

References

External links
STP party program (1973) (in Finnish)
1973 establishments in Finland
Defunct political parties in Finland
Left Alliance (Finland)
Political parties established in 1973
Political schisms
Socialist parties in Finland